Chittagong Collegiate School is a government educational institution in Chittagong, the southern port city in Bangladesh.It provides education from 5th to 12th grade. Established in 1836, it is one of the oldest and the best educational institutes in Chittagong and one of the in country.
In 2016 Chittagong Collegiate School celebrated its 180 years of establishment.

History
Chittagong Collegiate School and College was established as Chittagong Government School in 1836. The school was the first English medium high school in Chittagong. Its classes were held in a brick building constructed during the early years of British rule. The school was then shifted to a new location at the southern section of the market Sahib Hills. In 1886, the school was relocated to its present location at Collegiate School Road, North Nalapara, near the Chittagong Railway Station, and was named as Chittagong Collegiate School. Until the first decade of the twentieth century, the school was popularly known as the Entrance School.

In 2008 the college section was introduced and the Government renamed the school Chittagong Collegiate School and College.

Facilities

The school has a dormitory for the residential students and has a residential area for the teachers. It has a large campus with a large playground. It also has a Mosque just beside the school and school ground.
The institution offers its students vocational education as well as academic qualifications. The institution is also undertaking the development of its sports facilities which includes a swimming pool within the school campus. The school field which was filled with sand has been made a grassy playground.
The school section offers teaching in two shifts over six days a week to its over 2000 students in its 21 classrooms. The school also has a library, a computer lab, two science labs, three halls and one auditorium.
This school also has a well-established debate club named "Collegiate School Debating Society (CSDS)".

Notable alumni
Humayun Ahmed: Noted Bangladeshi writer studied in Collegiate school.

 Muhammad Yunus, nobel peace prize winner in 2006 for his contribution on poverty alleviation of the ultra poor, founder of Grameen Bank and the microcredit theory of economics
 Mahbubul Alam Tara, Eminent Political Personality, Entrepreneur, President, Bangladesh Jatiyatabadi Krishak Dal. MP-Feni-Sonagazi, Whip, Bangladesh Parliament
 Abdullah-Al-Muti, scientist
 Jamal Nazrul Islam, scientist and professor of physics and mathematics in Chittagong University.
 Abul Hayat, actor with appearances on television
 Engr. Mosharraf Hossain, politician and businessman
 Nabinchandra Sen, Bengali poet

Celebration of 175 years

Chittagong Collegiate School celebrated its 175 years in 2011. The ceremony was generated by many ex-students in the websites and social networking sites. They also celebrated its 180 years in 2016.

References

External links 
Chattogram Collegiate School web site

Schools in Chittagong District
Schools in Chittagong
Educational institutions established in 1836
1836 establishments in India
Public colleges in Chittagong
Public schools in Chittagong
Chittagong Collegiate School and College